The 1999–2000 season was Football Club Internazionale Milano's 91st in existence and 84th consecutive season in the top flight of Italian football.

Season 
Following a poor previous season, Inter welcomed the arrival of Marcello Lippi on the bench. Striker Christian Vieri was acquired from Lazio for €49,000,000 which broke the world transfer record at the time. The other purchases were Di Biagio, Peruzzi, Blanc (France national team captain), Panucci, Jugović, and the winter window added Iván Córdoba and Seedorf.

Vieri proved to be an excellent goalscorer, scoring five times in first the month of the league, bringing Inter to the top of the standings. However, when autumn came, the side lost him and his partner, Ronaldo, to heavy injuries. Inter was not able to retain their advantage: Lazio and Juventus surpassed them, leaving Lippi's side in fourth place. After the regular season, Inter beat Parma in a play-off awarding the last spot of the Champions League: Inter won 3–1, with two goals scored from Roberto Baggio in his last appearance for the side. Inter also had the chance to win a trophy but failed, losing the final of the Coppa Italia to Lazio for a 2–1 aggregate.

Squad
Squad at end of season

Left club during season

Transfers

Winter

Competitions

Serie A

League table

Results by round

Matches

UEFA Champions League qualification

Internazionale qualified to 2000–01 UEFA Champions League's third qualifying round, while Parma qualified to the 2000–01 UEFA Cup first round.

Coppa Italia

Eightfinals

Quarterfinals

Semifinals

Finals

Statistics

Appearances and goals
As of 31 June 2001

References

Inter Milan seasons
Internazionale